The historical title Vice-Admiral of the West is sometimes applied to holders of the crown appointment Vice-Admiral of the Coast of counties in the South West of England.

The duties of a Vice-Admiral of the coast were to control the shipping (especially piracy) around a maritime county's coast and organise defense on land and at sea. He also acted as a local judge to deal with maritime matters.

It is not entirely clear if the role of Vice-Admiral of the West was in fact separate or additional to the role either Vice-Admiral of the Coast of Cornwall or Vice-Admiral of the Coast of Devon. Appointees to both these posts seem to have been described in writings after their deaths as Vice-Admiral of the West despite appearing appointed to their counties in contemporary papers.

The following are said to have been Vice-Admirals of the West:

Sir John Arundell of Trerice - said to have held the post under Edward VI
Sir Arthur Champernowne - Vice-Admiral of the Devon Coast 1562 - 1577
Sir Walter Raleigh - Vice-Admiral of the Devon Coast 1586 - 1603

Royal Navy
Royal Navy appointments
Military ranks of the United Kingdom